FC Altai is a Kazakh professional football club based in Semey. They play in the Kazakhstan First Division, the second level of Kazakh football.

History
The club was founded in January 2016  from the merger of two clubs, Spartak Semey and Vostok.  It is a professional team and plays in the First Division.

Domestic history

References

External links
FC Altay at vk.com
Official page at Facebook

Football clubs in Kazakhstan
2016 establishments in Kazakhstan
Association football clubs established in 2016
Semey